The Allamuchy Township School District is a comprehensive community public school district that serves students in pre-kindergarten through eighth grade from Allamuchy Township, in Warren County, New Jersey, United States.

As of the 2020–21 school year, the district, comprised of two schools, had an enrollment of 421 students and 32.8 classroom teachers (on an FTE basis), for a student–teacher ratio of 12.8:1.

The district is classified by the New Jersey Department of Education as being in District Factor Group "I", the second-highest of eight groupings. District Factor Groups organize districts statewide to allow comparison by common socioeconomic characteristics of the local districts. From lowest socioeconomic status to highest, the categories are A, B, CD, DE, FG, GH, I and J.

Students in public school for ninth through twelfth grades attend Hackettstown High School which serves students from Hackettstown, as well as students from the townships of Allamuchy, Independence and Liberty, as part of sending/receiving relationships with the Hackettstown School District. As of the 2020–21 school year, the high school had an enrollment of 864 students and 69.5 classroom teachers (on an FTE basis), for a student–teacher ratio of 12.4:1.

Schools
Schools in the district (with 2020–21 enrollment data from the National Center for Education Statistics) are:
Mountain Villa School with 134 students in pre-Kindergarten through second grade
Melissa Sabol, Principal
Allamuchy Township School with 287 students in third through eighth grade
Jennifer A. Gallegly, Principal

Administration
Core members of the districts' administration are:
Melissa Sabol, Superintendent
Danielle Tarvin, Business Administrator / Board Secretary

Board of education
The district's board of education is comprised of nine members who set policy and oversee the fiscal and educational operation of the district through its administration. As a Type II school district, the board's trustees are elected directly by voters to serve three-year terms of office on a staggered basis, with three seats up for election each year held (since 2014) as part of the November general election. The board appoints a superintendent to oversee the district's day-to-day operations and a business administrator to supervise the business functions of the district.

References

External links
Allamuchy Elementary School

Data for the Allamuchy Elementary School, National Center for Education Statistics
Hackettstown School District

Allamuchy Township, New Jersey
New Jersey District Factor Group I
School districts in Warren County, New Jersey